The Redemption is the second studio album by American singer Brooke Hogan. The album was released on July 21, 2009 under SoBe Entertainment and Fontana Records. Brooke collaborated with several artists for the album, including Stack$, Colby O'Donis, and Flo Rida. The album received more positive reviews than her debut, but sold only approximately 15,000 copies to date. A Mixtape was released on July 4, 2009 en-titled "Judgment Day" to coincide with the release of "The Redemption".

Recording
The album was recorded in Miami, Florida and Los Angeles, California. After Brooke's debut album, Undiscovered, failed to achieve much success, Brooke began recording new material for a second album only two months after the release. However, Brooke stated at the time, in December 2006, that the recording was not serious, and more for fun than for another record. Brooke was slated to re-release her debut album in February 2007, but opted to record her second album instead. Brooke did more writing throughout the spring of 2007, and stated she would be splitting from her label, SoBe Entertainment. Brooke later retracted those statements in August 2007, but did state she was very unhappy with her debut album and did not feel it truly reflected her as an artist. Brooke also stated she felt "controlled" by and disliked working with Scott Storch, and consequently would be departing from his company, SMC, but would remain with SoBe Entertainment. Brooke then stated in October she had signed with another label that works alongside SoBe Entertainment, called Fontana Records, and she was very happy with them. Brooke stated in November 2007 that she was then seriously recording her second album, and it would be released in late spring or early summer of 2008.

In July 2008, Hogan stated she wanted to write and record more songs as she was enjoying taking time with the album which she felt was more "her". In September 2008, Brooke stated she was 50% done with the album, and could have it out by March 2009. Hogan later stated in March 2009 she was about 90% done with the album, and would record over the course of the next two or three months, just to make sure it was a better album than her first, because she felt that she made a lot of mistakes making that album. In early May 2009, Brooke recorded the second single "Hey Yo!" with Colby O'Donis, and eventually had a short fling with him as seen on Brooke Knows Best. Hogan stated on June 18, 2009, she was finally done with what she called her best album. Brooke stated she had spent two and a half years making the album, and had recorded from December 2006 to June 2009.

Singles
 "Falling" was released as the first official single from the album on March 31, 2009. The song was announced to be the official lead single from her second album in early March 2009, after the promo single "By Heart". A music video was filmed in mid-April 2009, and premiered on May 19, 2009 on her official website. After the song failed to garner success, Brooke stated that she was recording even more material, and that her album was going to be released on June 30, 2009.
 "Hey Yo!" was released as the second official single from the album on June 30, 2009. Hogan confirmed on July 3 that she would be filming the video right before the album's release. After only a few days the song debuted at number 48 on iTunes.
 "Ruff Me Up" was going to be released as the third official single from the album on September 8, 2009. The song was announced as the third single on July 10, 2009. A video was to be filmed in mid-August 2009, but was then re-scheduled to late September, and the release of the single up to September 8, 2009 until being canceled in favor of "Strip", which eventually was canceled too.

Critical reception

Reviews for the album have been fairly mixed, but more positive than reviews for her debut album Undiscovered.

Us Weekly gave the album a positive 3 out of 4 stars review, stating: "Brooke Hogan knows best . . . not to put out a CD like her weak 2006 debut. Luckily, the VH1 reality star, 21, has whipped up a much-improved set of pop love songs for her second effort."

Allmusic gave the album a mixed 2 and 1/2 stars stating: "In a sense, there's a crass purity to the bad taste of Redemption, as it's nothing more than the product of a pretty, curvy girl who just wants to sing, and producers who create tracks to fit those curves, and if it's not a lot of fun to hear Hogan and team race toward the same goal on parallel tracks, at least it produces a whole lot of bewildered fascination."

Ron Harris of the Associated Press wrote: "Brooke Hogan may know best on her reality show, but she should have known better than churning out the lackluster album "The Redemption." It's all tricks, and few treats. On most songs it's hard to tell where the vocoder and production tricks end and Hogan's own voice begins. This is bad, since Hogan has a perfectly fine pop music voice. But she lets the folks behind the mixing board overpower her to a fault."

Commercial reception
The Redemption debuted at number 144 on the Billboard 200 with 3,381 copies sold.

In popular culture
The album's second track "Strip" was featured in the pilot episode of Comedy Central's The Jeff Dunham Show, in which Hogan made a guest appearance.

Track listing

Charts

Release history

References

External links
 Official Website

2009 albums
Brooke Hogan albums
Albums produced by Shep Goodman